Jonathan Nitzan is Professor of Political Economy at York University, Toronto, Canada.

Work
Nitzan is the co-author (with Shimshon Bichler) of Capital as Power: A Study of Order and Creorder, published 2009. Their writings focus of the nature of capital in capitalism and provide an alternative view to that of Marxian and neoclassical economics. In their theory, capital is the quantification of power. According to their power theory of value, in capitalism, power is the governing principle as rooted in the centrality of private ownership. Private ownership is wholly and only an act of institutionalized exclusion, and institutionalized exclusion is a matter of organized power. Central to this theory is the concept of differential accumulation where firms strive to profit more by beating the average profit level.

Nitzan and Bichler share an intellectual legacy with institutional political economists such as Thorstein Veblen. In particular, they share Veblen's explanation that business exists with the end of pecuniary (monetary) gain and not the accumulation of goods of consumption or of physical machines.

Major works
 Nitzan, Jonathan and Shimshon Bichler – Global Political Economy of Israel – 2002
 Nitzan, Jonathan and Shimshon Bichler – Capital as Power: A Study of Order and Creorder – 2009

References

External links
 The Bichler and Nitzan Archives
 Video: Jonathan Nitzan speaks on the political economy of the Iraq invasion, Harvard Law School, March 18, 2008

Institutional economists
Academic staff of York University
Living people
20th-century Canadian economists
20th-century Canadian male writers
Canadian male non-fiction writers
Year of birth missing (living people)